Pehredaar Piya Ki (English: Protector of husband) was an Indian mystery television serial that was broadcast on Sony TV. It premiered on 17 July and ended on 28 August 2017. After the show was cancelled, it returned with a leap due to controversies revolving around child marriage. It starred Tejaswi Prakash and Affan Khan in the lead roles.

Premise 
It follows the life of a young girl Diya, who fulfills the wish of a dying man on his death bed by taking the responsibility of an orphan boy, Ratan Maan Singh, by marrying him. What follows next is a beautiful bond of friendship between the couple and being there for each other in an platonic way. She then becomes the temporary owner of Maan Singh Heritage Group of Hotels until Ratan is old enough to take over.

Restructured series
Public backlash surrounding the underage marriage of 18-year-old Diya to 9-year-old Ratan prompted producer Shashi Sumeet to end the show and to restructure the idea as a new series, Rishta Likhenge Hum Naya. Affan Khan, who played young Ratan, had been replaced by Rohit Suchanti as an older Ratan.

After Pehredaar Piya Ki had aired, an online petition to ban the show was signed by more than 1 lakh people to take action against the show as they believed it was promoting child marriage. The case reached the BCCC, who have asked the makers of the show to change the time slot so the kids couldn't watch it and air it to 10 pm slot along with a disclaimer that it does not promote child marriage. Supporters of the show started the petition too against the ban, to stop targeting the show, which was signed by over 13 thousand supporters.

The makers of the show, Sumeet Hukamchand Mittal and Shashi Mittal defended their show by clearing the controversies related to the show by calling a press conference at a suburban hotel in Mumbai. On 19 August 2017, a new promo was released by Sony, that starting from 22 August, the show would air at 10:30 pm IST. On 28 August, Sony TV had confirmed that the show has gone off air as the makers were not happy with the late time slot, as the show was meant for particular audience. Instead of continuing with the show, they decided to end it and focus on their new show instead with a renewed story.

Cast

Main
 Tejaswi Prakash as Diya Ratan Singh: Ratan's wife.
 Affan Khan as Ratan Maan Singh: Diya's husband.

Recurring
 Parmeet Sethi as Maan Singh 
 Kishori Shahane as Padma Singh
 Gireesh Sahedev as Sajjan Singh
 Anjali Gupta as Mrs Sajan Singh
 Manisha Saxena as Isha Singh
 Jiten Lalwani as Bhuvan Singh
 Meenu Panchal as Sakshi Singh
 Achherr Bhaardwaj as Mohak Pratap Singh
 Suyyash Rai as Abhay
 Simran Natekar as Shivani
 Kasturi Banerjee as Nitya
 Varun Jain as Ayush
 Swapnil Sharma as Priya Singh

Production

Casting
The story of the serial is set in Rajasthan. Tejaswi Prakash is seen in the serial as the female lead, an object of affection of a nine-year-old prince. It was being shot at various locations in Rajasthan including Jaipur and Mandawa.

In late August, a casting call was released for a recast of Ratan Singh to play the grown up prince in the new show titled Rishta Likhenge Hum Naya. On September 24, it was announced that Rohit Suchanti has replaced child  actor Affan Khan.

References

External links
  Pehredaar Piya Ki on Sony TV

2017 Indian television series debuts
2017 Indian television series endings
Hindi-language television shows
Television shows set in Rajasthan
Sony Entertainment Television original programming
Indian drama television series
Indian mystery television series
Shashi Sumeet Productions series
Television episodes about child marriage